Jovan Pavlović (22 October 1936 – 3 April 2014) was a Serbian Orthodox prelate who was the metropolitan bishop of Zagreb and Ljubljana of the Serbian Orthodox Church from 1982 until his death in 2014. He was one of the most prominent individuals in Serbian community in Croatia during his lifetime. 

Jovan was born in the village of Medinci in 1936 and died in the Sisters of Charity Hospital in Zagreb on 3 April 2014. He was the highest representative of the Serbian Orthodox Church in Croatia for more than two decades.

Early life and education
Jovan was born in Medinci in 1936. He finished elementary school in Medinci and secondary in Podravska Slatina. After he completed his seminary education at Rakovica Monastery he graduated at University of Belgrade Faculty of Orthodox Theology in 1963. Postgraduate studies he attended at several universities in West Germany. At the Evangelical Academy in Schleswig and Faculty of Theology of University of Kiel studies Evangelical theology. He studied Catholic theology at Ludwig Maximilian University of Munich. During this period, he spent some time in Chevetogne Abbey in Belgium and St. Matthias' Abbey and Niederaltaich Abbey in Germany.

Jovan worked as a professor in the Serbian Orthodox Seminary of Prizren and in Krka monastery. In 1967, in Krka he became a monk and in 1969 a hierodeacon. In 1977, he became bishop of Lepavina Monastery and Metropolitan of Zagreb in 1982.

Metropolitan of Zagreb and Ljubljana (1982–2014) 
Between 1982 and 1992 Metropolitan Jovan was representative of Serbian Orthodox Church at World Council of Churches. He was member of Holy Synod of Serbian Orthodox Church in several mandates. Serbian Orthodox churches in Italy were also under his jurisdiction, from 1994 to 2011.

Awards and recognition
Croatian Helsinki Committee Award for promotion of inter-religious dialogue and religious tolerance.

References

1936 births
2014 deaths
Bishops of the Serbian Orthodox Church
Croatian theologians
Eastern Orthodox theologians
Ludwig Maximilian University of Munich alumni
Metropolitanate of Zagreb and Ljubljana
Serbs of Croatia
Serbian theologians
University of Belgrade Faculty of Orthodox Theology alumni
University of Kiel alumni